This is a list of civil parishes in the ceremonial county of Staffordshire, England. There are 195 civil parishes.

There is no population data for some of the smallest parishes.

The districts of Tamworth and Stoke-on-Trent are fully unparished. Parts of Cannock Chase District and the boroughs of Newcastle under Lyme and Stafford are unparished. These correspond to two separate parts of the former Cannock Urban District, the former municipal boroughs of Stafford, Newcastle-under-Lyme and Tamworth as well as the former county borough of Stoke-on-Trent.

See also
 List of civil parishes in England

References

External links
 Office for National Statistics : Geographical Area Listings
 Staffordshire County Council

Civil parishes
Staffordshire
 
Civil parishes